Brendan Connell (born 1970) is an American author and translator. Though his work often falls into the horror and fantasy genres, it has also often been called unclassifiable and avant-garde. His style has been compared to that of J.K. Huysmans and Angela Carter. Some of his shorter fiction, such as that contained in his collection Metrophilias, has been referred to as prose poetry.

Influences he has cited include Balzac and Ponson du Terrail. He has also written many lyrics for the Serbian band Kodagain.

Bibliography

Novels 
The Translation of Father Torturo, Prime Books, 2005
The Architect, PS Publishing, 2012
Miss Homicide Plays the Flute, Eibonvale Press, 2013
The Cutest Girl in Class, Snuggly Books, 2013
The Galaxy Club, Chomu Press, 2014
Cannibals of West Papua, Zagava, 2015
Clark, Snuggly Books, 2016
The Heel, Snuggly Books, 2017
Unofficial History of Pi Wei, Snuggly Books, 2018
The Metapheromenoi, Snuggly Books, 2020
Against the Grain Again: The Further Adventures of Des Esseintes, Tartarus Press, 2021
Heqet, Egaeus Press, 2022

Collections 
Metrophilias, Better Non Sequitur, 2010
Unpleasant Tales, Eibonvale Press, 2010
The Life of Polycrates and Other Stories for Antiquated Children, Chomu Press, 2011
Lives of Notorious Cooks, Chomu Press, 2012
The Metanatural Adventures of Dr. Black, PS Publishing, 2014
Jottings from a Far Away Place, Snuggly Books, 2015
Pleasant Tales, Eibonvale Press, 2017

Translations 
Requiems and Nightmares, by Guido Gozzano, Hieroglyphic Press, 2012 (translated together with Anna Fonti Connell)

Anthologies  edited 
The Neo-Decadent Cookbook, Eibonvale Press, 2020 (edited together with Justin Isis)
The World in Violet: An Anthology of English Decadent Poetry, Snuggly Books, 2022

Interviews 
 Brendan Connell Interview (Weird Fiction Review, September 2012)
 Brendan Connell Interview (Rising Shadow, March 2014)
 Brendan Connell Interview (Porta VIII, January 2015)
 Brendan Connell Interview (Cultured Vultures, February 2016)

References

External links 

 

1970 births
Living people
American horror writers
American speculative fiction critics
20th-century American novelists
21st-century American novelists
Postmodern writers
American short story writers
20th-century American non-fiction writers
21st-century American non-fiction writers
Weird fiction writers